Barnwell is a surname. Notable people with the surname include:

Angela Barnwell (1936-1965), British swimmer
Brian Barnwell, American lawyer
Charles Frederick Barnwell (1781–1849), British antiquarian and museum curator
Chris Barnwell, (born 1979), Baseball infielder
Edward Barnwell, (1813–1887), British antiquarian and schoolmaster
Frank Barnwell, (1880–1938), pioneering aeronautical engineer
Harold Barnwell, (1878–1917), Aircraft pioneer
John Barnwell, (born 1938), British former soccer player and manager
John Barnwell (colonist), (1671–1724), Irish emigrant to South Carolina
John Barnwell (cricketer), (1914-1998), First-class cricketer
John Barnwell (senator) (1748–1800), soldier and public official from South Carolina
Juliette Walker Barnwell (died 2016), Bahamian educator and public administrator 
Malcolm Barnwell, (born 1958), American football player
Michael Barnwell, (born 1943), First-class cricketer
Middleton Barnwell, (1882-1957), Bishop of Idaho
Robert Barnwell, (1761–1814), South Carolina revolutionary and statesman
Robert Woodward Barnwell, (1801−1882), US-American politician
Jonathan Barnwell, (Born 1987), BMF